Petka is a village situated in Lazarevac municipality in Serbia.

References

Villages in Serbia
Lazarevac